William Joseph Rorabaugh (1945–2020) was an American historian. He was a professor of history at the University of Washington, and from 2003–08 he was the managing editor of Pacific Northwest Quarterly.

Life 
He graduated from Stanford University and the University of California, Berkeley with a PhD in 1976. He was a book reviewer and the author of several works of American history. In July 2006 he became president of the Alcohol and Drugs History Society.

He has studied the history of beer in America. Rorabaugh's 1979 book The Alcoholic Republic: An American Tradition demonstrated the exceedingly high rate of alcohol consumption in the United States in the early nineteenth century. At the time, Rorabaugh argued, "Americans preferred cider and whiskey because those drinks contained more alcohol than beer, which was too weak for American taste... One can only conclude that at the root of the alcoholic republic was the fact that Americans chose the most highly alcoholic beverages that they could obtain easily and cheaply."

In his more recent work on the decade of the 1960s in American history, Rorabaugh has suggested a redefinition of "the sixties." In his 2002 book Kennedy and the Promise of the Sixties, he wrote: "It is possible to argue that the sixties did not begin until 1965, when African Americans rioted in Watts and when large numbers of American combat troops were sent to Vietnam, and did not end until 1974 when Richard Nixon resigned, or even 1975, when the North Vietnamese marched into Saigon." Rorabaugh identified the earlier half of the decade as distinct both from the 1950s and "the sixties": "The early sixties, then, is important because it was an in-between time, a short space lodged between a more conservative, cautious, and complacent era that preceded it and a more frenzied, often raucous, and even violent era that followed."

Publications
 [A study of American alcohol consumption in the Early Republic.]

 [A study of the unrest on the Berkeley campus of the University of California during the era of the Free Speech Movement.]

References

External links
W. J. Rorabaugh, The Alcoholic Republic: An American Tradition.

21st-century American historians
21st-century American male writers
Social historians
Historians of the United States
University of Washington faculty
1945 births
2020 deaths
American male non-fiction writers